Romer is a surname. Some individuals with the surname include:

 Wolfgang William Romer (1640–1713), Dutch/British military engineer
 Ole Rømer (1644–1710), Danish astronomer
 John Lambertus Romer (1680–1754), British military engineer
 Johann Jacob Roemer (1763–1819), Swiss physician and naturalist
 Michał Józef Römer (1778–1853), politician, writer, and notable member of the Polish-Lithuanian gentry
 Isabella Frances Romer (1798–1852), English travel writer and novelist
 Edward Jan Römer (1806−1878), Polish painter
 Friedrich Adolph Roemer (1809–1869), German geologist
 Emma Romer (1814–1868), British soprano
 Ferdinand von Roemer (1818–1891), German geologist, brother of Friedrich Adolph Roemer
 John Romer (politician) (fl. 1831), 19th century Governor of Bombay
 Alfred Isidore Romer, (1832–1897), Belarusian, Polish and Lithuanian painter, sculptor, carver and medalist, participant of the January Uprising (1863)
 Sir Robert Romer (1840–1918), British judge
 Edward Mateusz Römer (1848–1900), Polish painter
 Mark Romer, Baron Romer (1866–1944), British judge
 Eugeniusz Romer (1871–1954), Polish cartographer
 Lucien von Römer (1873–1965), Dutch physician, botanist and writer
 Michał Pius Römer (1880–1945), Lithuanian lawyer
 Carrol Romer (1883–1951), British surveyor, inventor of the Romer, and lawyer
 Josef “Beppo” Römer (1892–1944), German anti-fascist Freikorps leader and KPD organizer
 Alfred Romer (1894–1973), U.S. paleontologist
 Tadeusz Romer (1894–1978), Polish diplomat and politician
 Sir Charles Romer (1897–1969), British judge
 Charles E. Roemer, II (1923–2012), Louisiana planter, businessman, and politician
 William F. Roemer, Jr. (1926–1996), U.S. FBI agent
 Piet Römer (born 1928), Dutch actor
 Roy Romer (born 1928), governor of Colorado
 Elizabeth Roemer (born 1929), U.S. astronomer
 John Romer (Egyptologist) (born 1941), British egyptologist
 Buddy Roemer (1943–2021), U.S. politician
 John Roemer (born 1945), U.S. economist
 Kenneth Roemer (born 1945), U.S. scholar of utopian, American, and Native American literature.
 Hanne Rømer (born 1949), Danish composer
 Paul Romer (born 1955), U.S. economist
 Timothy J. Roemer (born 1956), U.S. politician and ambassador
 Christina Romer (born 1958), U.S. economist, chair of the Council of Economic Advisers
 David Romer (born 1958), U.S. economist
 Marcus Romer (born 1961), UK theatre director
 Emile Roemer (born 1962), Dutch politician
 Max Joseph Roemer (1791–1849), German botanist 
 Sarah Roemer (born 1984), U.S. actress

Germanic-language surnames